Stere Sertov (5 February 1963 – 3 May 2022) was a Romanian footballer who played as a forward.

Club career
Stere Sertov was born on 5 February 1963 in Mihail Kogălniceanu, Constanța. He made his Divizia A debut at age 18, playing for Steaua București in a 1–0 victory against Progresul București. In 1982, Sertov went to play for Dinamo București where he appeared in only three Divizia A games but managed to win the title. He went to play afterwards at Politehnica Iași where in two seasons he scored 8 goals in 41 Divizia A appearances but an injury kept him off the field for the following two seasons. He returned to play at Politehnica Iași, this time in Divizia B, moving after two seasons at CFR Pașcani who was also participating in Divizia B, where after only one season he ended his career and became a judicial police officer, he has a total of 62 appearances and 10 goals scored in Divizia A. On 3 May 2022, Sertov died at the Floreasca Hospital in Bucharest after suffering from diabetes.

International career
Stere Sertov represented Romania U20 at the 1981 World Youth Championship from Australia, playing 6 games in which he scored one goal in a 1–0 victory against South Korea in the group stage, helping the team finish the tournament in the 3rd position, winning the bronze medal.

Honours
Dinamo București
Divizia A: 1982–83

References

1963 births
2022 deaths
Romanian footballers
Association football forwards
Romania youth international footballers
Liga I players
Liga II players
FC Dinamo București players
FC Steaua București players
FC Politehnica Iași (1945) players
People from Constanța County